Ceromitia crinigerella is a species of moth of the  family Adelidae. It is known from Mozambique and South Africa.

References

Adelidae
Lepidoptera of Mozambique
Lepidoptera of South Africa
Moths of Sub-Saharan Africa